This is a list based on CIA World Factbook, Flightglobal, Vertical Magazine and Ainonline along with the civil and military helicopter fleet.

This entry gives the total number of heliports with hard-surface runways, helipads, or landing areas that support routine sustained helicopter operations exclusively and have support facilities including one or more of the following facilities: lighting, fuel, passenger handling, or maintenance. It includes former airports used exclusively for helicopter operations but excludes heliports limited to day operations and natural clearings that could support helicopter landings and takeoffs.

Heliports, helipads and Helicopters by country

Cities with most Heliports and Helicopters

References

External links
 Heliports around China
 Helipads, Heliports and Private airports around the world
 Rotorcraft Operations and Statistics March 2011
 HAI Helicopter Annual Report 2011  
 Global Military Helicopters Market
 China boosts helicopter industry

Lists of countries by economic indicator